Hember Avu, also Aregerek and Musar, is a Papuan language of Sumgilbar Rural LLG, Madang Province, Papua New Guinea.

Distribution
Hember Avu is spoken in seven villages:
Salemben
Erinduk
Sevan
Erek Erek
Nagemak
Kumbu
Embor

References

Tiboran languages
Languages of Madang Province